The 21 cm L/35 were a family of German naval artillery developed in the years before World War I and used in limited numbers. This gun armed warships of the Argentine Navy, Imperial Chinese Navy, Royal Danish Navy, Imperial Japanese Navy and Royal Netherlands Navy before and after World War I. It was used in the First Sino-Japanese War, Boxer Rebellion and a ship captured by Japan in the Sino-Japanese War was later used in the Russo-Japanese War.

History 
In 1886, Krupp designed the 21 cm L/35 and started production for export customers in 1890. The 21 cm L/35 was produced in two models the No. 1 and No. 2. The main difference between the two guns was their weight, rifling, propellant charges and muzzle velocities. Otherwise their overall length and ammunition were the same.

Naval use 
 Argentina
  – one shielded 21 cm L/35 gun fore and one shielded, 21 cm L/35 gun aft

 China
  – two 21 cm L/35 guns mounted in a forward barbette
  – two 21 cm L/35 guns mounted in a forward barbette
  – two 21 cm L/35 guns mounted in a forward barbette
 Denmark
 HDMS Valkyrien – one shielded 21 cm L/35 gun fore and one shielded 21 cm L/35 gun aft
 Netherlands
  – two mounted 21 cm L/35 turret guns fore and one aft
 Hydra-class – one forward shielded 21 cm L/35 gun after 1890s refits
  – secondary armament of one shielded 21 cm L/35 gun aft
  – one 21 cm L/35 gun in a forward turret

Gallery

References

Footnotes

Bibliography 

 
 

210 mm artillery
Naval guns of Germany
World War I naval weapons